The 1979–80 Segunda División season saw 20 teams participate in the second flight Spanish league. Real Murcia, Real Valladolid and CA Osasuna were promoted to Primera División. Celta de Vigo, Deportivo de La Coruña, Gimnàstic de Tarragona and Algeciras CF were relegated to Segunda División B.

Teams

Final table

Results

Pichichi Trophy for top goalscorers

External links 
  Official LFP Site

Segunda División seasons
2
Spain